WLVQ (96.3 FM) — branded Q-FM 96 — is a commercial classic rock radio station licensed to Columbus, Ohio. Owned by the Columbus Radio Group subsidiary of Saga Communications, through its Franklin Communications licensee, the station serves the Columbus metro area. The WLVQ studios are located in Upper Arlington, OH, and the station transmitter is in Columbus on the Twin Rivers Drive tower.

History 

The 96.3 MHz frequency was first occupied by WLWF, a station owned by the Crosley Broadcasting Corporation along with sister station WLWC (now WCMH-TV); WLWF broadcast from 1949–1953.  WLVQ itself began on April 1, 1959 as WTVN-FM, owned by Taft Broadcasting Company along with sister stations  and WTVN-TV (now WSYX).  In 1966, WTVN-FM changed its callsign to WBUK and format to adult contemporary.  The station again switched formats and started playing "Beautiful Music" (easy listening) in 1969. The station reverted to the WTVN-FM call sign in 1974, but continued to play "Beautiful Music."

The station adopted the WLVQ call sign on February 14, 1977. The first song played was "New Kid in Town" by the Eagles.  For many years the station's mascot was The Q Kangaroo, a creature selected by a listener in a contest. Q-FM-96 was an early champion of, and outlet for, Columbus's vibrant rock music community, and was particularly notable for its "Hometown Album Project", a series of compilation LPs featuring local artists, which debuted shortly after the station signed on. Another program in the 1980s was the Sunday morning show "Psychedelic Sunday," showcasing 1960s-era rock, much of it relatively obscure, and hosted by British DJ Russell Carey.

On November 4, 2015, Saga Communications announced it had agreed to purchase WLVQ from Wilks Broadcast Group. Saga owns and operates Columbus stations WSNY, WVMX, WNND and WNNP through its Franklin Communications, Inc. subsidiary. The purchase by Saga was consummated on February 3, 2016 at a price of $13 million.

Current programming
Currently WLVQ/Q-FM-96 airs the Torg & Elliott morning show; Scott Torgerson and Jerry Elliott. Long time morning host Mark "Daddy Wags" Wagner is retired. Jerry Elliott and Kristie Kemper joined The Morning Show in 1990, Torg joined the show in 2013. Jerry was a stand-up comedian, Kristie came from the morning show at WAZU/Dayton, OH, and Torg, former afternoon drive personality on sports WBNS-FM/97.1 The Fan. Kristie Kemper also handles mid-days along with the Iconic Nooner feature. Archie steers the ship through afternoons with features like the 4:20 Haircut & the Joe Show Drive at Five on Fridays. In September 2022 “DaveMan” returned to Qfm96 after 16 years to take over evenings from Doug Risher who accepted a new position on Nantucket Island.

References

External links
QFM96

LVQ
Radio stations established in 1959
Classic rock radio stations in the United States
Taft Broadcasting